The Legend of Chu Liuxiang may refer to:

 The Legend of Chu Liuxiang, an umbrella title for the first three books in the Chu Liuxiang series of novels by Gu Long
 The Legend of Chu Liuxiang (2007 TV series), a 2007 Chinese television series based on the first three books in the Chu Liuxiang Series
 The Legend of Chu Liuxiang (2012 TV series), a 2012 Chinese television series based on four books in the second part of the Chu Liuxiang Series

zh:楚留香新傳